The 1979 Nations motorcycle Grand Prix was the fourth round of the 1979 Grand Prix motorcycle racing season. It took place on the weekend of 11–13 May 1979 at the Autodromo Dino Ferrari.

Classification

500 cc

References

Italian motorcycle Grand Prix
Nations
Nations